Falange is the name of a political party whose ideology is Falangism.

Falange primarily refers to:
 Falange Española, a Spanish political party active 1933–1934, it merged with the Juntas de Ofensiva Nacional-Sindicalista (JONS)
 Falange Española de las JONS, a Spanish political party active 1934–1937
 Falange Española Tradicionalista y de las JONS, formed in 1937 of the merger of the Carlist Party with the Falange Española y de las JONS

Falange may also refer to other political parties:
 Falange Española de las JONS (1976), Spanish political party founded in 1976
 La Falange (1999), Spanish political party founded in 1999
 Authentic Falange, Spanish political party founded in 2002
 Bolivian Socialist Falange, Bolivian party founded in 1937
 Lebanese Phalanges Party, another name of the Kataeb Party, a Lebanese party
 National Falange, Chilean party founded in 1935 and dissolved in 1957
Christian Democratic Party (Chile), founded in 1957, successor of the National Falange

See also 
 Falangism in Latin America
 Falanga (disambiguation)
 Phalanges, bones in the hands and feet